Książenice may refer to:

Książenice, Greater Poland Voivodeship, Poland
Książenice, Masovian Voivodeship, Poland
Książenice, Silesian Voivodeship, Poland